Ekaltadeta is an extinct genus of marsupials related to the modern musky rat-kangaroos. Ekaltadelta was present in what is today the Riversleigh formations in Northern Queensland from the Late Oligocene to the Miocene.

They are hypothesized to have been either exclusively carnivorous, or omnivorous with a fondness for meat, based on their chewing teeth. This conclusion is based mainly on the size and shape of a large buzz-saw-shaped cheek-tooth, the adult third premolar, which is common to all Ekaltadeta. A few specimens actually did also have long predatory "fangs".

Fossils of the animals include two near complete skulls, and numerous upper and lower jaws.

Taxonomy

The description of a new species and genus was published by Mike Archer and Tim Flannery in 1985. The type species is Ekaltadeta ima. It was originally put within the family of Potoroidae, but like the musky rat-kangaroo, the genus was moved to the family Hypsiprymnodontidae.

The name Ekaltadeta is derived from two words in an indigenous language associated with the McDonnell Ranges, combining the words for powerful, ekalta, and eta to describe the "powerful tooth".

The species assigned to this genus are

Ekaltadeta

Ekaltadeta ima Archer and Flannery 1985; the type species.
 Ekaltadeta jamiemulvaneyi Wroe 1996 
 Ekaltadeta wellingtonensis, Archer and Flannery, 1985. Tentatively placed as Proleopus wellingtonensis in later revision of the phylogeny of the subfamily Propleopinae  Archer and Flannery, 1985.

References

Prehistoric macropods
Oligocene mammals of Australia
Miocene mammals of Australia
Pliocene mammals of Australia
Pleistocene mammals of Australia
Oligocene marsupials
Miocene marsupials
Prehistoric marsupial genera
Fossil taxa described in 1985
Riversleigh fauna
Diprotodonts